Imperfect Paradise is a podcast series published by LAist Studios and funded by the Corporation for Public Broadcasting.

Production and awards 
Season one, episode one was released in January 2022. 

Season three was shortlisted for a 2022 International Documentary Association Best Multi-Part Audio Documentary or Series.

Seasons 
 Home is Life, 3 episodes about homelessness and housing in Orange County, California. Season 1 was hosted by Jill Replogle.
 The Forgotten Revolutionary, 8 episodes about the life and death of activist and broadcaster Oscar Gomez. Season 2 was hosted by Adolfo Guzman-Lopez.
 Sheriff Villanueva, 5 episodes about the election and work of Los Angeles County Sheriff Alex Villanueva. Season 3 was hosted by Frank Stoltze.
 Yoga’s Queen of Conspiracies, 3 episodes focussing on the work of American yoga instructor Guru Jagat's adoption of QAnon conspiracy theories. Season 4 was produced and hosted by Emily Guerin.

References

External links 
 Official website

American podcasts
2022 podcast debuts
Corporation for Public Broadcasting